Paul 'Patch' Atcheson (born 17 May 1973) is a former Wales international rugby league footballer who played in the 1990s and 2000s.

Background
Atcheson was born in St Helens, Lancashire, England.

Playing career

Widnes
Paul Atcheson was an interchange/substitute in Widnes' 24-0 victory over Leeds in the 1991–92 Regal Trophy Final during the 1991–92 season at Central Park, Wigan on Saturday 11 January 1992.

Wigan
After the 1993–94 Rugby Football League season Atcheson travelled with defending champions Wigan to Brisbane, playing from the interchange bench in their 1994 World Club Challenge victory over Australian premiers, the Brisbane Broncos. Atcheson made one appearance for Great Britain Under-21s in 1993, and won caps for Wales national rugby league team while at Wigan in 1995 against England, France, and in the 1995 Rugby League World Cup against Western Samoa. Paul Atcheson played as an interchange/substitute, i.e. number 14, (replacing  Va'aiga Tuigamala) in Wigan's 40-10 victory over Warrington in the 1994–95 Regal Trophy Final during the 1994–95 season at Alfred McAlpine Stadium, Huddersfield on Saturday 28 January 1995.

Oldham
While at Oldham in 1996 he played for Wales against France, and England. In the 1997 post season, Atcheson was selected to play for Great Britain national rugby league team in all three matches of the Super League Test series against Australia. He also signed with St Helens.

St Helens
While at St. Helens in 1998 Atcheson played for Wales against England. Having won the 1999 Championship St. Helens contested in the 2000 World Club Challenge against National Rugby League Premiers the Melbourne Storm, with Atcheson playing fullback in the loss.

Widnes
Atcheson played for Wales while at Widnes in 2000 against South Africa, in the 2000 Rugby League World Cup against Cook Islands, Lebanon, New Zealand, Papua New Guinea, and Australia, in 2001 against England, in 2002 against New Zealand, and in 2003 against Russia, and Australia.

References

External links
!Great Britain Statistics at englandrl.co.uk (statistics currently missing due to not having appeared for both Great Britain, and England)
Statistics at wigan.rlfans.com
I was on the dole …now I'm facing those mighty Aussies 
Wasps' pounds 100,000 Atcheson sting 
Profile at saints.org.uk
The Teams: Wales 
Broncos cleared for club showdown
(archived by web.archive.org) Statistics at orl-heritagetrust.org.uk

1973 births
English rugby league players
Great Britain national rugby league team players
Great Britain under-21 national rugby league team players
Living people
Oldham R.L.F.C. players
Rugby league fullbacks
Rugby league players from St Helens, Merseyside
St Helens R.F.C. players
Wales national rugby league team captains
Wales national rugby league team players
Widnes Vikings players
Wigan Warriors players